Leonard Parker Moore (died January 1959) was an English literary agent.

A partner of Christy & Moore and of the Lecture Agency, Ltd., his clients included George Orwell (from 1932 to 1950), Gordon Campbell, Mary Butts, Georgette Heyer (for nearly 30 years from 1922), Carola Oman, Marco Pallis, Catherine Cookson, Jane Mander, Ruby M. Ayres, Gareth Jones, Wilfred Grenfell, and Ruth Collie.

Injured in the leg in the First World War, Moore worked as a journalist before becoming a literary agent. He was the brother of the novelist Henry Moore.

Orwell
It was in a letter to Moore, in November 1932, regarding the future publication of Down and Out in Paris and London, that Eric Blair first came up with the pseudonym "George Orwell".

According to the historian Daniel J. Leab, some 500 of Orwell's letters to his agent have survived, of which nearly 100 were acquired by the Lilly Library in 1959.

References

Bibliography
Shelden, Michael (ed.) George Orwell: Ten Animal Farm Letters to His Agent, Leonard Moore (1984)

George Orwell
Year of birth missing
1959 deaths
Literary agents